Pumdibhumdi is a former Village Development Committee  south of Pokhara in Kaski District in the Gandaki Zone of northern-central Nepal. In 2015 it was annexed to Pokhara. At the time of the 1991 Nepal census it had a population of 6,512 persons living in 1326 individual households.

References

External links
UN map of the municipalities of Kaski District

Populated places in Kaski District